Shiver is the second studio album by Icelandic musician Jónsi, frontman of the post-rock band Sigur Rós. The album was released on 2 October 2020 via Krunk. It comes 10 years after his previous solo effort, Go. It was made in collaboration with English music producer, singer and head of record label PC Music, A. G. Cook.

The album is 11 tracks long and features a largely electronic musical palette, differing from the music Jónsi has created in the past. It was supported by the singles "Exhale", "Swill", "Cannibal" and "Salt Licorice". It features collaborations with Scottish singer and vocalist of the band Cocteau Twins, Elizabeth Fraser, and Swedish singer Robyn. The album cover was shot by Barnaby Roper.

Background 
On 8 May 2018, A. G. Cook took part in Sigur Rós' Liminal takeover on NTS Radio. Cook shared remixes of Sigur Rós tracks, as well as demos for Jónsi, hinting at further collaboration between the two in the future.

On 28 June 2019, Jónsi was interviewed by The Feed SBS, where he shared he had an upcoming collaboration with Swedish singer Robyn for his next album, stating, "It's really good. It’s full on like thump, thump, thump.”

On 3 April 2020, Jónsi took to Instagram to announce that he was releasing music later that month.

Release and promotion 
On 14 April 2020, Jónsi announced his lead single off of Shiver, "Exhale", would be released 23 April. "Exhale" was released with an accompanying music video, directed by Jónsi and Giovanni Ribisi.

On 20 June, Jónsi announced another single, "Swill", set for release on 24 June. "Swill" was released with an accompanying music video, directed by Barnaby Roper.

The same day, Jónsi announced that his second studio album Shiver would be released on 2 October of the same year; the album preorder and track listing were also made available. Jónsi wrote in a press release announcing the album:

On 1 August, Jónsi began teasing another single release for the album, followed by another teaser on 8 August. On 12 August, Jónsi announced the release of "Cannibal", which features Scottish singer and vocalist of the band Cocteau Twins, Elizabeth Fraser, as the third single from the album, due for release on 14 August. It was released with an accompanying music video, directed by Jónsi and Giovanni Ribisi.

Jónsi began releasing teasers for tracks on the album, beginning on 17 September, and ending on 24 September.

Jónsi confirmed the release of the final single for the album, "Salt Licorice" featuring Swedish singer Robyn, on 29 September. The single was released the next day on 30 September, with an accompanying music video directed by Jónsi & Rene van Pannevis, which Jónsi filmed in lockdown.

Track listing 
All tracks written by Jónsi and produced by A. G. Cook and Jónsi, except where noted.

Notes
  signifies an additional producer
"Beautiful Boy" is a reworking of the track "TB8" by Frakkur, a Jónsi side project.

Personnel 
Credits adapted from Jónsi's Instagram.

Additional performers 
 Jack Armitage (track 6)
 Julianna Barwick (track 4)
 A. G. Cook (all tracks)
 Elizabeth Fraser (track 3)
 Samuli Kosminen (tracks 3, 4, 7 and 10)
 Mary Lattimore (track 4)
 Nico Muhly (tracks 2 and 10)
 Nicolas Petitfrère (tracks 2–6)
 Robyn (track 7)

Technical 
 A. G. Cook – engineering (all tracks)
 Nicolas Petitfrère – additional engineering (track 5)
 Damon Reece – additional engineering (track 3)
 Alex Somers – additional engineering (tracks 7, 8 and 10)
 Geoff Swan – mixing (all tracks)

Design and artwork 
 Sarah Hopper – design
 Jónsi – design
 Pandagunda – inside image
 Barnaby Roper – cover photography, inside image

Charts

Release history

References 

2020 albums
Jónsi albums
Albums produced by A. G. Cook